The Los Angeles Times Book Prize for Graphic Novel/Comics, established in 2009, is a category of the Los Angeles Times Book Prize. Works are eligible during the year of their first US publication in English, though they may be written originally in languages other than English.

Recipients

References 

English-language literary awards
21st-century literary awards
Awards established in 1980
International literary awards
Awards established in 2009
21st-century graphic novels